The 2014 Colonial Athletic Association baseball tournament was held at Brooks Field on the campus of UNC Wilmington in Wilmington, North Carolina, from May 21 through 24.  In its first season in the conference, College of Charleston won the tournament for the first time, earning the Colonial Athletic Association's automatic bid to the 2014 NCAA Division I baseball tournament.

Seeding and format
Continuing the format adopted in 2012, the top six finishers from the regular season competed in the double-elimination tournament.  The top two seeds, William & Mary and College of Charleston, earned first round byes.

Bracket

All-Tournament Team
The following players were named to the All-Tournament team. College of Charleston pitcher Bailey Ober, one of the Cougars' five selections, was named Most Outstanding Player.

References

Tournament
Colonial Athletic Association Baseball Tournament
Colonial Athletic Association baseball tournament
Colonial Athletic Association baseball tournament
College baseball tournaments in North Carolina
Baseball competitions in Wilmington, North Carolina